The Iron Cross was established by law in 1833 following the end of the Belgian Revolution to recognise serious wounds received and bravery in battle by Belgian citizens taking part in the fight for Belgian independence from the United Kingdom of the Netherlands between 25 August 1830 and 4 February 1831. A further royal decree of 22 August 1834 created a second class to the Iron Cross for award to all wounded combatants.  Due to the lower perceived importance of the second class award and discontent among recipients, the Iron Cross second class was short-lived and amalgamated to the Iron Cross first class by decree of 21 February 1835.  All recipients now received the (original) first class award.

Award statute
The Iron Cross (first class) was bestowed to members of the provisional government and to other citizens who were wounded in battle and who elected to stay at their post and keep fighting or who returned to the fight, to the maimed and mutilated, as well as to those who displayed acts of courage in combat and eminent services to the country.  Recipients were also honoured with the right to bear arms.

The Iron Cross second class was bestowed to all wounded combatants.  All recipients of the Iron Cross 2nd class would receive the 1st class award (original single grade award) in 1835 to replace the by then defunct 2nd class variant.

Over the years, recipients of the Iron Cross received ever increasing pensions, in 1842, those in need or not having any other pension or income would receive 100 francs, this amount was increased to 250 francs in 1855.  A law of 27 May 1857 gave civil servants who were recipients of the Iron Cross ten additional years of seniority.  A budgetary law enacted in 1858 gave pensions to widows and orphans of deceased recipients of the Iron Cross.

Award description

Iron Cross 1st class
The Iron Cross first class was a black Maltese Cross struck from iron with a gold central medallion.  The cross was outlined in gold and small gilt orbs were affixed to the eight tips of the cross arms.  The obverse of the gold central medallion bore the gilt relief image of the Belgian lion, an heraldic "lion rampant", but moving from left to right, surrounded by a golden disc.  The reverse bore the gilt relief inscription "1830" also surrounded by a golden disc.

The cross was suspended by a ring through an upper lateral suspension loop from a 31mm wide red silk moiré ribbon with 1.3mm wide yellow edge stripes bordered on the inside by 2.7mm wide black stripes.

Iron Cross 2nd class
The Iron Cross second class was an octagonal medal struck from iron.  Its obverse bore the relief image of the Belgian lion, an heraldic "lion rampant" on a pedestal, but moving from left to right, with banners to the left and right, the relief circular inscription along the medal's upper edge translating into "TO THE DEFENDERS OF THE COUNTRY".  The relief bore the relief coats of arms of the nine Belgian provinces arranged in a circle around a sun with the relief year "1830" superimposed over it, all of which are surrounded by the relief circular inscription translating into "INDEPENDENCE OF BELGIUM".  The award was topped by a pivot mounted crown from which it was suspended to the same ribbon as the cross first class by a ring through a suspension loop.

Notable recipients (partial list)
The individuals listed below were awarded the Iron Cross:

Lieutenant General Baron André Jolly
Prime Minister Charles Rogier
Governor Baron Feuillen de Coppin de Falaën
Count Félix de Merode
Civic Guard General Baron Ghislain van der Linden d’Hooghvorst
Prime Minister Count Félix de Muelenaere
Count Jacques-André Coghen
Colonel Charles de Brouckère
Prime Minister Henri de Brouckère
State Minister Viscount Charles Vilain XIIII
State Minister Baron Charles-Augustin Liedts
State Minister Count Barthelemy de Theux de Meylandt
Baron Pierre de Schiervel
State Minister Baron Adolphe de Vrière
Lieutenant General Baron Pierre Chazal
Lieutenant General Laurent-Mathieu Brialmont
State Minister Baron Édouard d’Huart
Lieutenant General Nicolas Daine
Civic Guard Honorary Lieutenant General Charles-Joseph Pletinckx

See also

 List of Orders, Decorations and Medals of the Kingdom of Belgium

References

Further reading
 Quinot H., 1950, Recueil illustré des décorations belges et congolaises, 4e Edition. (Hasselt)
 Cornet R., 1982, Recueil des dispositions légales et réglementaires régissant les ordres nationaux belges. 2e Ed. N.pl.,  (Brussels)
 Borné A.C., 1985, Distinctions honorifiques de la Belgique, 1830-1985 (Brussels)

External links
Belgian National Orders (In French)
Royal Library of Belgium  (In French)
List of recipients of the Iron Cross, P.-M. Michelli, Brussels, 1865 (In French)
ARS MORIENDI Notables from Belgian history  (In French and Dutch)

Orders, decorations, and medals of Belgium
Military awards and decorations of Belgium
Awards established in 1833
1833 establishments in Belgium